Microtechnites bractatus, the garden fleahopper, is a species of plant bug in the family Miridae.

References

Further reading

External links

 
 

Miridae
Insects described in 1832